The Palace of Tranquil Longevity, literally, "peaceful old age palace", also called the Qianlong Garden, Qianlong Palace, Qianlong District or the Palace of Tranquility and Longevity, is a palace in Beijing, China, located in the northeast corner of the Inner Court of the Forbidden City.

Construction of the palace began on the Qianlong Emperor's orders in 1771, in preparation for his retirement, although the emperor himself never moved into the palace.  Its beautiful apartments, pavilions, gates and gardens feature "some of the most elegant spaces at a time widely considered to be the pinnacle of Chinese interior design." Throughout the Qing dynasty, the palace was almost never used, largely because of the Qianlong Emperor's imperial decree ordering his retirement retreat remain unaltered.

History
In 1778, after a candidate at the imperial examination questioned the Qianlong Emperor publicly about naming a successor during an official tour in the north, the emperor, then 67 years old, announced in a court letter that "if fate would allow him to live so long, he would abdicate the throne at the age of 85 by Chinese reckoning, which would be in 1796." He "reassured the Chinese people that he had secretly chosen his heir, and that the choice was safely written down."  His decision to "withdraw into leisure" was made to avoid breaking the record of his grandfather, the Kangxi Emperor, as the longest ruling emperor of China (61 years, 318 days), an important act of filial piety for the conservative Qianlong Emperor.

Although he pledged to retire, and took the title of Retired Emperor after officially yielding the throne to his son (the Jiaqing Emperor) after 60 years, 124 days of rule, the Qianlong Emperor never spent a night in his Palace of Tranquil Longevity, and continued to hold on to power. The Jiaqing Emperor reigned only nominally until his father's death on 7 February 1799, making the Qianlong Emperor's actual reign 63 years and 122 days long.

That an imperial retirement retreat was built at all is a testament to the significance the Qianlong Emperor placed on honoring his grandfather, the Kangxi Emperor, and by extension how paramount public deference to Confucian thought and filial obligations was to the Qianlong Emperor, quite unlike the previous Manchu (non-Han) rulers that preceded him.  This retirement palace was built as an important cultural and political statement, and as gesture of solidarity with Chinese social mores amid enduring anti-Qing sentiment.  The details within the lavish, two-acre walled retreat further affirm the Qianlong Emperor's love and affinity for Chinese culture, and are indicative of his decorative, architectural, and landscaping tastes, as well as his intentions and goals for China.

Despite the Qianlong Emperor never having moved into his retirement suites, they were not damaged by other inhabitants or looters in the intervening centuries; "the garden has remained virtually unchanged since its initial construction, thanks in no small measure to the emperor's decree that the site not be altered by future generations, the eighteenth-century equivalent of a landmarks preservation law."

Restoration
The Qianlong Garden is currently undergoing restoration in a new partnership between the Palace Museum in Beijing and the New York-based World Monuments Fund. To tackle the myriad challenges of such a unique restoration, including assessing the Qianlong Emperor's idiosyncratic mixture of Han, Manchu, and European materials and techniques and battling centuries of dust and decay, the project brought together the (American) WMF's "well-practiced conservation techniques" and Chinese experts' "deep understanding of the Qianlong Emperor's architectural tastes and decorative predilections.  The supporting cast includes aging artisans whose rarefied skills somehow survived the Cultural Revolution, when traditional craftsmanship was considered bourgeois and worthy of punishment." The partnership's "slavishly faithful restoration" of the first suite completed, the Juanqinzhai, is "somewhat of a milestone" in China, where, according to The New York Times, "historic preservation usually entails razing a structure and replacing it with a brightly painted replica."

Beijing's China Daily lauded the achievements of the Juanqinzhai, and reported that "The results have been so successful that the WMF, a private, non-profit New York-based preservation group, has extended its alliance with Chinese cultural officials to restore the Qianlong Garden's 26 other buildings and four courtyards." The Chinese have contributed an additional  to extend the project. The entire , long-term restoration of the Qianlong Garden was initially slated to end in 2017, but now is expected to finish in 2019, in time for the Forbidden City's 600th anniversary in 2020.

Inside the Qianlong Garden
Inside the decorative walls are 27 structures, though the WMF lists 24 sites on its restoration map, including apartments, pavilions, gates and more.

As restoration continues, more of the buildings of the Qianlong Garden are expected to be opened to the public for study and tours.  As of 2012, few have studied the apartments of the Qianlong Emperor's retreat, aside from the Juanqinzhai in the Palace's fourth courtyard, where restoration began in 2007.

Juanqinzhai (倦勤斋)

The first of the Qianlong Garden apartments to be restored, the emperor's Juanqinzhai, "retirement lodge" or literally, "Studio of Exhaustion From Diligent Service", was completed in 2010 after a  effort by Beijing's Palace Museum and the American-sponsored World Monuments Fund (WMF). The Juanqinzhai, accompanied by about 100 exquisite Qianlong era artifacts, "sumptuous murals, furniture, architectural elements, Buddhist icons, and decorative arts—almost all of which have never before been seen publicly," began a tour of the United States in fall 2010. The 1.5-million-yuan exhibition was first organized and debuted at the Peabody Essex Museum, in Salem, Massachusetts, then in 2011 had stints at the Metropolitan Museum of Art in New York, and finally, at the Milwaukee Art Museum in Milwaukee, Wisconsin.

The Juanqinzhai is now regarded as one of the only surviving examples of 18th-century Chinese interior design: "only the successive residential palaces of the Qianlong Emperor in the Forbidden City can make any claim to preserve many components of an original secular interior of the pre-1840 period."

See also
 Principles for the Conservation of Heritage Sites in China

Notes

References

Houses completed in the 18th century
Buildings and structures in Beijing
Forbidden City
Qianlong Emperor